This page is a glossary of Prestressed concrete terms.

A

B

C

D

E

F

G

H

I

J

K

L

M

N

O

P

Q

R

S

T

U

V

W

Y

See also

 Cable-stayed bridge
 Cantilever bridge
 Concrete
 Concrete beam
 Concrete slab
 Construction
 Glossary of engineering
 Glossary of civil engineering
 Glossary of structural engineering
 Incremental launch method
 Precast concrete
 Prestressed concrete
 Prestressed structure
 Reinforced concrete
 Segmental bridge
 Prestressing Wedges

References 

Building engineering
Civil engineering
Prestressed concrete construction
Structural engineering
Prestressed Concrete
Concrete
Wikipedia glossaries using description lists